Wild Asia is a social enterprise, headquartered in Kuala Lumpur, focusing on conservation of natural areas and support of local communities dependent upon natural resources.

One of Wild Asia's initiatives is the Wild Asia Responsible Tourism Awards which, every year since 2006, recognizes Asia-based sustainability superstars in the travel industry, and remains the only regional award program for responsible travel. The awards are based on the Global Sustainable Tourism Council's criteria. The Responsible Tourism Awards are part of Wild Asia's Responsible Tourism Initiative.

Another key initiative is the Palm Oil Initiative, which has been Wild Asia's longest standing areas of interest. Wild Asia finds technical solutions to promote sustainability across the entire oil palm supply chain. Wild Asia supports both large and small organisations, including small farmers, to meet the requirements of buyers or International Standards, mostly the Sustainable Palm Oil, RSPO. They built up the experience of palm oil producers in Malaysia, Indonesia, Papua New Guinea, Solomon Islands, Thailand, Cameroon and Ghana. Since 2008, Wild Asia haw completed 92 assignments and trained over 2,019 professionals and NGOs.
Major projects include “Supply Chain” Risk Assessments for Cargill (Malaysia), HSBC (Malaysia), Mitsui Corporation (Japan) and Nestle (Malaysia).

Wild Asia also works in other environmental areas such as island and reef conservation and biodiversity in production landscapes as well as responsible tourism. Some of the core work that they do include providing research, peer reviews and other technical inputs on a wide range of projects, assisting businesses through advisory, audits and training to implement global sustainability standards such as RSPO and providing training workshops to encourage awareness of environmental and social impacts to business and corporate managers.

References

External links
 

Nature conservation in Malaysia
Environmental organisations based in Malaysia